Kevin Boyd Gartrell  (born 4 March 1936) is an Australian cricketer. He played ten first-class matches for Western Australia between 1959/60 and 1962/63.

See also
 List of Western Australia first-class cricketers

References

External links
 

1936 births
Living people
Australian cricketers
Western Australia cricketers
Recipients of the Medal of the Order of Australia
Recipients of the Australian Sports Medal